The Sun Alliance (AS) is a political alliance in Benin. Its current president is Sacca Lafia.

History
The AS was established on 21 December 2014 as an alliance of the Union for Democracy and National Solidarity (UDSN), the Union for Relief (UPR) and Hope Force (FE), three parties based in the north of Benin. The UPR and FE had contested the 2011 parliamentary elections together, winning two seats.

In the April 2015 parliamentary elections the AS received 6.7% of the vote, winning four seats.

References

Political party alliances in Benin
2014 establishments in Benin
Political parties established in 2014